Pertica is a genus of extinct plants.

Pertica may also refer to:
 Pertica, a Roman length equivalent to 3 m (see Ancient Roman units of measurement)
 Pertica, the name of the dependent territory of Roman Carthage that connected the colony to the local African towns of its hinterland.
 Pertica Alta, an Italian municipality of the Province of Brescia, Lombardy
 Pertica Bassa, an Italian municipality of the Province of Brescia, Lombardy
 Bill Pertica (1898–1967), an American baseball player
 Schistura pertica, a genus of fishes
 Segestrioides, a genus of spiders synonymized with Pertica

See also
Perticara, an Italian hamlet of Novafeltria (RN), Emilia-Romagna
Corleto Perticara, an Italian municipality of the Province of Potenza, Basilicata